The  is a research institute attached to Kyoto University, hosting researchers in the mathematical sciences from all over Japan.  RIMS was founded in April 1963.

List of directors
 Masuo Fukuhara (1963.5.1 – 1969.3.31)
 Kōsaku Yosida (1969.4.1 – 1972.3.31)
 Hisaaki Yoshizawa (1972.4.1 – 1976.3.31)
 Kiyoshi Itō (1976.4.1 – 1979.4.1)
 Nobuo Shimada (1979.4.2 – 1983.4.1)
 Heisuke Hironaka (1983.4.2 – 1985.1.30)
 Nobuo Shimada (1985.1.31 – 1987.1.30)
 Mikio Sato (1987.1.31 – 1991.1.30)
 Satoru Takasu (1991.1.31 – 1993.1.30)
 Huzihiro Araki (1993.1.31 – 1996.3.31)
 Kyōji Saitō (1996.4.1 – 1998.3.31)
 Masatake Mori (1998.4.1 – 2001.3.31)
 Masaki Kashiwara (2001.4.1 – 2003.3.31)
 Yōichirō Takahashi (2003.4.1 – 2007.3.31)
 Masaki Kashiwara (2007.4.1 – 2009.3.31)
 Shigeru Morishige (2009.4.1 – 2011.3.31)
 Shigefumi Mori (2011.4.1 – 2014.3.31)
 Shigeru Mukai (2014.4.1 – 2017.3.31)
 Michio Yamada (2017.4.1 – present)

Notable researchers

Current researchers
Takashi Kumagai
Shinichi Mochizuki
Takurō Mochizuki, a plenary speaker at the International Congress of Mathematicians in 2014.
Shigeru Mukai
Kaoru Ono

Past researchers
Heisuke Hironaka, Fields Medalist
Kiyoshi Itō, Wolf Prize in Mathematics laureater
Kazuya Kato
Shigefumi Mori, Fields Medalist
Masaki Kashiwara, Chern Medal
Hiraku Nakajima, Cole Prize laureate
Mikio Sato, Wolf Prize in Mathematics laureater

External links
home page

Mathematical institutes
Kyoto University
Research institutes in Japan